Acleris delicata is a species of moth of the family Tortricidae. It is found in Japan (Honshu).

The wingspan is 14–15.5 mm.

References

Moths described in 1980
delicata
Moths of Japan